Changning may refer to:

Changning (prince) (1657–1703) was a prince of the Qing Dynasty.

Places
Changning District (长宁区), Shanghai
Changning, Hunan (常宁), county-level city of Hengyang
Changning County, Sichuan (长宁县)
Changning County, Yunnan (昌宁县)
Changning Subdistrict, Songyuan, in Ningjiang District, Songyuan, Jilin
Changning Subdistrict, Xichang, Sichuan
Changning Township, Gansu (昌宁乡), in Minle County
Changning Township, Hebei (常宁乡), in Yu County

Towns
Changning, Luannan County (长凝镇), Hebei
Changning, Yongshou County (常宁镇), Shaanxi
Changning, Jinzhong (长凝镇), in Yuci District, Jinzhong, Shanxi
Changning, Xiangning County (昌宁镇), Shanxi

Written as "长宁镇":
Changning, Guangdong, in Boluo County
Changning, Jiangxi, in Xunwu County
Changning, Qinghai, in Datong Hui and Tu Autonomous County
Changning, Wugong County, Shaanxi
Changning, Yibin, seat of Changning County, Sichuan